Dragan Glogovac (born 27 October 1967) is a Bosnian Serb former footballer.

Club career
Born in Bileća, SR Bosnia and Herzegovina, he started playing in the local club FK Hercegovac where he became member of the first team very young. Then he moved to NK Neretva and his good exhibitions brought him to the ranks of a Yugoslav First League club FK Velež Mostar.

After the breakup of Yugoslavia, he moved to Serbia and signed with FK Rad. He stayed in Belgrade until 1995 when he moved to the Spanish club Getafe CF. After one season, he moved to Belgium where he played in Royal Antwerp for two seasons. He still played in Greece in Apollon Athens and in China before returning to Serbia. He ended his career in 2002 playing for one of the growing Serbian clubs in the turn of the century, the FK Sartid, nowadays called FK Smederevo.

Personal life
His brother Stevan Glogovac was also a footballer.

References

External links
 
 
 

1967 births
Living people
People from Bileća
Serbs of Bosnia and Herzegovina
Association football midfielders
Yugoslav footballers
Bosnia and Herzegovina footballers
NK Neretva players
FK Velež Mostar players
FK Rad players
Getafe CF footballers
Royal Antwerp F.C. players
Apollon Smyrnis F.C. players
Shandong Taishan F.C. players
FK Radnički Beograd players
FK Smederevo players
Yugoslav First League players
First League of Serbia and Montenegro players
Segunda División players
Belgian Pro League players
Super League Greece players
Chinese Super League players
Bosnia and Herzegovina expatriate footballers
Expatriate footballers in Serbia and Montenegro
Bosnia and Herzegovina expatriate sportspeople in Serbia and Montenegro
Expatriate footballers in Spain
Bosnia and Herzegovina expatriate sportspeople in Spain
Expatriate footballers in Belgium
Bosnia and Herzegovina expatriate sportspeople in Belgium
Expatriate footballers in Greece
Bosnia and Herzegovina expatriate sportspeople in Greece
Expatriate footballers in China
Bosnia and Herzegovina expatriate sportspeople in China